DeShawn Shamaine Williams (born December 29, 1992) is an American football defensive end for the Carolina Panthers of the National Football League (NFL). He played college football at Clemson.

Professional career

Cincinnati Bengals
Williams signed with the Cincinnati Bengals as an undrafted free agent on May 8, 2015. He was released by the Bengals on September 5, 2015, during final roster cuts and was signed to the practice squad the next day. He spent his entire rookie season on the practice squad. He signed a reserve/futures contract with the Bengals on January 6, 2016.

He was released by the Bengals on November 26, 2016, but was re-signed two days later.

On September 2, 2017, Williams was waived by the Bengals and was signed to the practice squad the next day.

Denver Broncos
On January 17, 2018, Williams signed a reserve/future contract with the Denver Broncos. He was waived on September 1, 2018, and was signed to the practice squad the next day. He was released on September 11, 2018.

Miami Dolphins
On October 16, 2018, Williams was signed to the Miami Dolphins practice squad. On December 5, 2018, Williams was released from the Dolphins practice squad.

Indianapolis Colts
On December 10, 2018, Williams was signed to the Indianapolis Colts practice squad. He signed a reserve/future contract on January 13, 2019. He was waived on April 30, 2019.

Denver Broncos (second stint)
On May 13, 2019, Williams was signed by the Denver Broncos. He was released on August 31, 2019.

Calgary Stampeders
Williams signed with the Calgary Stampeders on December 5, 2019. He was released on August 11, 2020.

Denver Broncos (third stint)
On August 15, 2020, Williams re-signed with the Broncos, his third stint with the team. He was waived on September 5, 2020, but was signed to the practice squad the following day. He was promoted to the active roster on September 25, 2020. 

In Week 6 against the New England Patriots, Williams recorded his first career interception off a pass thrown by Cam Newton during the 18–12 win.
In Week 11 against the Miami Dolphins, Williams recorded his first two career sacks on Tua Tagovailoa during the 20–13 win.

Williams entered the 2021 season as a backup interior defensive lineman. He was named a starter in Week 8 and started the remainder of the season. He suffered an elbow injury in Week 16 and was placed on injured reserve on December 28. He finished the season with 39 tackles, one sack, and two passes defensed through 15 games and eight starts.

On March 18, 2022, Williams re-signed with the Broncos.

Carolina Panthers
On March 15, 2023, Williams signed a one-year contract with the Carolina Panthers.

References

1992 births
Living people
Players of American football from South Carolina
People from Central, South Carolina
American football defensive tackles
Calgary Stampeders players
Clemson Tigers football players
Cincinnati Bengals players
Denver Broncos players
Miami Dolphins players
Indianapolis Colts players
Carolina Panthers players